The Wrocław Africarium is the only themed oceanarium devoted solely to exhibiting the fauna of Africa. Located in Wrocław, Poland, the Afrykarium is part of the Wrocław Zoo. The idea behind the Afrykarium is to comprehensively present selected ecosystems from the continent of Africa. The Africarium houses multiple species of fish, the hippos, African fur seals, manatees and many others. The zoo houses over 10 thousand animals, its breadth extends from housing insects such cockroaches to the large mammals like the elephants on an area of over 33 hectares.

References

2014 establishments in Poland
Buildings and structures in Wrocław
Zoos in Poland
Tourist attractions in Wrocław
Oceanaria